Marco Cavagna (1958 – August 9, 2005) was an Italian amateur astronomer.

During his career, Cavagna discovered numerous asteroids, operating from the Sormano Astronomical Observatory in Sormano, northern Italy. The Minor Planet Center credits him with the discovery of 19 minor planets he made between 1994 and 1998. In the 1970s and 1980s, he was one of Italy's leading observers of comets and national coordinator during the International Halley Watch in 1986. Cavagna was also a lecturer at the planetarium of Milan, co-founder of the Sormano Observatory, and a consultant for IAU's commission XX (Positions & motions of minor planets, comets and satellites).

Cavagna died of a stroke on 9 August 2005. The 0.5-meter Ritchey–Chrétien telescope at Sormano Observatory is now named in his memory. The inner main-belt asteroid 10149 Cavagna, discovered by astronomers Maura Tombelli and Andrea Boattini at San Marcello Pistoiese Observatory, was named after him in 1999.

References

External links 
 Osservatorio Astronomico Sormano website

1958 births
2005 deaths
Discoverers of asteroids

20th-century Italian astronomers